plim may be:

An acronym for:
"Probability limit" (plim) – see  Convergence in probability
"Phosphorescence Lifetime Imaging Microscopy" (PLIM) - An imaging technique similar to Fluorescence-lifetime imaging microscopy but based on phosphorescence rather than fluorescence.
"Physical Layer Information Module" (PLIM) in Router and Switches
"Plant Life Management" (PLIM) in nuclear power
"Programmable Logic In-the-Middle" (PLIM) - A technique in computing where dataflows originated from a CPU are routed through a block of FPGA for analysis and manipulation.